Mikko Hermanni Hyppönen (born 13 October 1969) is a Finnish computer security expert, speaker and author. He is known for the Hyppönen Law about IoT security, which states that whenever an appliance is described as being "smart", it is vulnerable. He works as the Chief Research Officer at WithSecure (former F-Secure for Business) and as the Principal Research Advisor at F-Secure.

Career
Mikko Hyppönen has worked at F-Secure in Finland since 1991.

Hyppönen has assisted law enforcement in the United States, Europe and Asia since the 1990s on cybercrime cases and advises governments on cyber crime. His team took down the Sobig.F botnet.

In 2004, Hyppönen cooperated with Vanity Fair on a feature, The Code Warrior, which examined his role in defeating the Blaster and Sobig Computer worms.

Hyppönen has given keynotes and presentations at a number of conferences around the world, including Black Hat, DEF CON, DLD, RSA, and V2 Security. In addition to data security events, Hyppönen has delivered talks at general-interest events, such as TED, TEDx, DLD, SXSW, Slush and Google Zeitgeist. He's also spoken at various military events, including AFCEA events and the NATO CCD COE's ICCC. Hyppönen is a reserve officer in the Finnish Army.

Hyppönen is a member of the advisory board of IMPACT (International Multilateral Partnership Against Cyber Threats) since 2007 together with Yevgeny Kaspersky, Hamadoun Touré, Fred Piper and John Thompson.

Hyppönen is a columnist for BetaNews and Wired. He has also written on his research for CNN, The New York Times and Scientific American.

In 2011, he was ranked 61st in Foreign Policys Top 100 Global Thinkers report.

Hyppönen coined the term "Cybercrime Unicorns" to describe cybercrime organizations that are worth over a billion US dollars - a reference to Startup unicorns

Computer security history
Hyppönen made international news in 2011 when he tracked down and visited the authors of the first PC virus in history, Brain. Hyppönen produced a documentary of the event. The documentary was published on YouTube.

Hyppönen has also been documenting the rise of mobile phone malware since the first smartphone viruses were found.

The blog "News from the Lab", started by Hyppönen in 2004 was the first blog from any antivirus company.

Hyppönen has been credited by Twitter for improving Twitter's security.

Hyppönen has been the Curator for the Malware Museum at The Internet Archive since 2016.

He published his first book in October 2021, and its English translation, If It's Smart, It's Vulnerable, was published in June 2022.

See also
 Antivirus software
 CARO
 EICAR
 IMPACT

References

External links

  
 
 
 "Fighting viruses, defending the net" (TEDGlobal 2011)
 "Three types of online attack" (TEDxBrussels 2011)
 
 "How the NSA betrayed the world's trust — time to act" (TEDxBrussels 2013)
 Cybercrime Unicorns lecture at University College London, April 2022
 Hyppönen and Nyman (2017), The Internet of (Vulnerable) Things: On Hyppönen's Law, Security Engineering, and IoT Legislation. Technology Innovation Management Review, 7(4) 5–11.
 References on Embassy cables leaked by WikiLeaks
 
 
 Jake Edge: Living with the surveillance state a summary of Hyppönen's talk at LinuxCon Europe 2013. LWN.net
 10. April 2017, TTÜ Haridustehnoloogiakeskus, Public lecture by Mikko Hyppönen at Mektory, youtube.com

1969 births
Living people
Finnish computer programmers
Chief technology officers of computer security companies